Oliver Allen may refer to:
Oliver Allen (footballer) (born 1986), former English professional footballer
Oliver Allen (speedway rider) (born 1982), former British motorcycle speedway rider

See also
David Oliver Allen (1800–1863), American missionary
Allen (surname)